</noinclude>

Judeo-Arabic dialects are ethnolects formerly spoken by Jews throughout the Arabic-speaking world. Under the ISO 639 international standard for language codes, Judeo-Arabic is classified as a macrolanguage under the code jrb, encompassing four languages: Judeo-Moroccan Arabic (aju), Judeo-Yemeni Arabic (jye), Judeo-Iraqi Arabic (yhd), and Judeo-Tripolitanian Arabic (yud).

Judeo-Arabic can also refer to Classical Arabic written in the Hebrew script, particularly in the Middle Ages.

Many significant Jewish works, including a number of religious writings by Saadia Gaon, Maimonides and Judah Halevi, were originally written in Judeo-Arabic, as this was the primary vernacular language of their authors.

Characteristics 
The Arabic spoken by Jewish communities in the Arab world differed slightly from the Arabic of their non-Jewish neighbours. These differences were partly due to the incorporation of some words from Hebrew and other languages and partly geographical, in a way that may reflect a history of migration. For example, the Judeo-Arabic of Egypt, including in the Cairo community, resembled the dialect of Alexandria rather than that of Cairo (Blau). Similarly, Baghdad Jewish Arabic is reminiscent of the dialect of Mosul. Many Jews in Arab countries were bilingual in Judeo-Arabic and the local dialect of the Muslim majority.

Like other Jewish languages and dialects, Judeo-Arabic languages contain borrowings from Hebrew and Aramaic. This feature is less marked in translations of the Bible, as the authors clearly took the view that the business of a translator is to translate.

Dialects 
 Judeo-Iraqi
Judeo-Baghdadi
 Judeo-Moroccan
 Judeo-Tripolitanian
 Judeo-Tunisian
 Judeo-Yemeni

History 

Jews in Arabic, Muslim majority countries wrote—sometimes in their dialects, sometimes in a more classical style—in a mildly adapted Hebrew alphabet rather than using the Arabic script, often including consonant dots from the Arabic alphabet to accommodate phonemes that did not exist in the Hebrew alphabet.

By around 800 CE, most Jews within the Islamic Empire (90% of the world’s Jews at the time) were native speakers of Arabic like the populations around them. The language quickly became the central language of Jewish scholarship and communication, enabling Jews to participate in the greater epicenter of learning at the time, which meant that they could be active participants in secular scholarship and civilization. The widespread usage of Arabic not only unified the Jewish community located throughout the Islamic Empire but also facilitated greater communication with other ethnic and religious groups, which led to important manuscripts of polemic, like the Toledot Yeshu, being written or published in Arabic or Judeo-Arabic. 

Some of the most important books of medieval Jewish thought were originally written in medieval Judeo-Arabic, as well as certain halakhic works and biblical commentaries.  Later they were translated into medieval Hebrew so that they could be read by contemporaries elsewhere in the Jewish world, and by others who were literate in Hebrew.  These include:

 Saadia Gaon's Emunoth ve-Deoth (originally ), his tafsir (biblical commentary and translation) and siddur (explanatory content, not the prayers themselves)
 David ibn Merwan al-Mukkamas
 Solomon ibn Gabirol's Tikkun Middot ha-Nefesh
 Bahya ibn Paquda's Kitab al-Hidāya ilā Fara'id al-Qulūb, translated by Judah ben Saul ibn Tibbon as Chovot HaLevavot
 Judah Halevi's Kuzari 
 Maimonides' Commentary on the Mishnah, Sefer Hamitzvot, The Guide for the Perplexed, and many of his letters and shorter essays.

Most communities also had a traditional translation of the Bible into Judeo-Arabic, known as a sharḥ ("explanation"): for more detail, see Bible translations into Arabic. The term sharḥ sometimes came to mean "Judeo-Arabic" in the same way that "Targum" was sometimes used to mean the Aramaic language.

Present day 
In the years following the 1948 Arab–Israeli War, the end of the Algerian War, and Moroccan and Tunisian independence, most Mizrahi and Sephardi Jews in Arab countries were expelled, without their property, mainly for mainland France and for Israel. Their distinct Arabic dialects in turn did not thrive in either country, and most of their descendants now speak French or Modern Hebrew almost exclusively; thus resulting in the entire continuum of Judeo-Arabic dialects being considered endangered languages. This stands in stark contrast with the historical status of Judeo-Arabic: in the early Middle Ages, speakers of Judeo-Arabic far outnumbered the speakers of Yiddish. There remain small populations of speakers in Algeria, Morocco, Tunisia, Lebanon, Yemen, Israel and the United States.

Orthography

See also
 Arabic language in Israel
 Judeo-Berber language
 Judeo-Iraqi Arabic
 Baghdad Jewish Arabic
 Judeo-Moroccan Arabic
 Judeo-Tunisian Arabic
 Judeo-Yemeni Arabic
 Judeo-Syrian Arabic
 Letter of the Karaite elders of Ascalon
 Arab Jews
 Haketia

Endnotes

Bibliography

 Blanc, Haim, Communal Dialects in Baghdad: Harvard 1964
Blau, Joshua, The Emergence and Linguistic Background of Judaeo-Arabic: OUP, last edition 1999
 Blau, Joshua, A Grammar of Mediaeval Judaeo-Arabic: Jerusalem 1980 (in Hebrew)
 Blau, Joshua, Studies in Middle Arabic and its Judaeo-Arabic variety: Jerusalem 1988 (in English)
 Blau, Joshua, Dictionary of Mediaeval Judaeo-Arabic Texts: Jerusalem 2006
 Mansour, Jacob, The Jewish Baghdadi Dialect: Studies and Texts in the Judaeo-Arabic Dialect of Baghdad: Or Yehuda 1991
 Heath, Jeffrey, Jewish and Muslim dialects of Moroccan Arabic (Routledge Curzon Arabic linguistics series): London, New York, 2002.

External links
 Alan Corré's Judeo-Arabic Literature site, via the Internet Archive
 Judeo-Arabic Literature
 Reka Kol Yisrael, a radio station broadcasting a daily program in Judeo-Moroccan Arabic
 Jewish Language Research Website  (description and bibliography)
 Tafsir Rasag, a translation of the Torah into literary Judeo-Arabic, at Sefaria

 
Languages of Sicily